The 1949–50 Western Kentucky State Hilltoppers men's basketball team represented Western Kentucky State College (now known as Western Kentucky University) during the 1949-50 NCAA University Division Basketball season. The Hilltoppers were led by future Naismith Memorial Basketball Hall of Fame coach Edgar Diddle and All-American center Bob Lavoy.  The team then won the Ohio Valley Conference season championship and appeared in the 1950 National Invitation Tournament.   During this period, the NIT was considered to be on par with the NCAA tournament.  Lavoy and Johnny Givens were named to the All-Conference team, Lavoy was also selected to the OVC All-Tournament team.

Schedule

|-
!colspan=6| Regular Season

|-

 

|-
!colspan=6| 1950 Ohio Valley Conference Tournament

|-
!colspan=6| 1950 National Invitation Tournament

References

Western Kentucky Hilltoppers basketball seasons
Western Kentucky State
Western Kentucky State
Western Kentucky State Basketball, Men's
Western Kentucky State Basketball, Men's